Joseph Eugene Porter (born March 22, 1977) is an American former professional football player who was an outside linebacker for 13 seasons in the National Football League (NFL), and is a former outside linebackers coach for the Pittsburgh Steelers. After playing college football for the Colorado State Rams, he was selected by the Steelers in the third round of the 1999 NFL Draft. A four-time Pro Bowl selection, Porter won Super Bowl XL with the Steelers over the Seattle Seahawks. He played for the Miami Dolphins from 2007 to 2009 and the Arizona Cardinals from 2010 to 2011.

Early years
Porter's prep career took place at Foothill High School in Bakersfield, California. He was a two-time All-Conference selection as wide receiver and running back for the Trojans. His senior season, he led the team to a 9–2 mark and a berth in the sectional playoffs, rushing the ball 86 times for 1,086 yards. After his final season at Foothill, he was named to the All-Section and All-State teams. He lettered twice in football, plus twice in basketball. He also played soccer as a youth.

Porter has never moved from his hometown and ran a youth football camp at Foothill throughout his career.

College career
While attending Colorado State University, Porter was a standout on the football field for the Colorado State Rams football team. He began his college career as an H-back and did not see his first action on the defensive line until his junior year. He was a third-team All-American and All-Western Athletic Conference first-team selection by The Sports Network. He registered 22 career sacks. As a senior, he recorded 53 tackles (36 solos) with eight quarterback pressures and 12 tackles-for-losses. He finished third in National Collegiate Athletic Association (NCAA) Division I-A with a school single-season record-tying 15 sacks for minus 63 yards. He majored in exercise and sport science. He is a member of Phi Beta Sigma fraternity.

Professional career

Pittsburgh Steelers
The Pittsburgh Steelers selected Porter in the third round (73 overall) of the 1999 NFL Draft. Porter was the eighth linebacker drafted in 1999.

During the preseason, Porter wore number 95, the first Steelers player to wear the number since Steelers linebacker great Greg Lloyd was released following the 1997 season. However, despite his similarities to Lloyd in terms of playing style and vocal leadership (or perhaps because of it), Porter changed his jersey number to 55 just before the start of the regular season in order to develop his own identity. He also took 55 in honor of his childhood hero, Junior Seau.

He finished the preseason as the team's leading tackler, recording 22 total tackles (18 solo). He also recorded a team-high four sacks and forced a fumble. He went on to excel on special teams during the 1999 season, with his time on defense increasing as the year went on. His first career sack came on Cleveland Browns quarterback Tim Couch on September 12, when he also forced a fumble on the play. He partially deflected a punt against the Jacksonville Jaguars on December 2. In the season finale against the Tennessee Titans, Porter accumulated six tackles and a sack. He also forced and recovered a Neil O'Donnell fumble and returned it 46 yards for a score.

In 2000, Porter finished second behind Jason Gildon and set a career-high with 10.5 sacks on the year. He and Gildon also tied a franchise record with 24 sacks as a duo. On the year, he registered 74 tackle (51 solo), one interception, three passes defensed, two forced fumbles and a fumble recovery. He was voted the AFC Defensive Player of the Month in October. Against the Cincinnati Bengals on October 15, he registered eight tackles (seven solo), three sacks including one for a safety, four quarterback hurries and a forced fumble. He had five tackles and two sacks in a game against the Baltimore Ravens two games later. Porter's first career interception came against the Tennessee Titans on November 5 on a pass from Steve McNair. His second career touchdown came on a 32-yard fumble recovery against the Philadelphia Eagles on November 12. He closed out the season with 1.5 sacks against the San Diego Chargers on December 24.

During the September 17 game against the rival Cleveland Browns in Cleveland, Porter tackled punter Chris Gardocki while Gardocki was trying to punt the ball. While Porter would be penalized for roughing the punter, Gardocki briefly laid motionless, then subsequently flipped the middle finger twice to Steelers head coach Bill Cowher. The incident, caught on live television, resulted in a $5,000 fine for Gardocki. The two would later be teammates with the Steelers from 2004–2006.

Porter had a career day against the Tampa Bay Buccaneers on October 21, 2001, recording six tackles, four sacks and a pass deflected while earning American Football Conference (AFC) Defensive Player of the Week honors. Two weeks later he registered four tackles and two sacks against the Baltimore Ravens. He missed the season finale against the Browns – the first time he failed to play in his NFL career – due to a shoulder injury. He finished with 59 tackles and nine sacks on the season.

In Week 2 of the 2002 season, Porter had what is likely the best game of his professional career. In a 30–17 loss to the Oakland Raiders on September 15, Porter recorded seven tackles, three sacks, two interceptions and two passes defensed. The performance, during which he returned one interceptions 84 yards, earned him AFC Defensive Player of the Week honors. He recorded five tackles, two sacks and a forced fumble in a 34–7 win over the Cincinnati Bengals on October 13. On the year, Porter recorded nine sacks – the third straight year of eclipsing the mark – while setting career highs in tackles (88), interceptions (4) and interception return yards (153). He was selected to his first Pro Bowl following the season.

In 2003, Porter recorded the lowest sack total of his career since his rookie year, while missing two games due to a gunshot wound suffered on August 31, 2003 outside of a Denver bar, just before the beginning of the season. He recorded a sack and recovered a fumble in his first game back against the Bengals on September 21. On October 26 against the St. Louis Rams, he had six tackles, a pass defense and two sacks—his only multiple-sack game of the year. In 14 games played, he recorded 65 tackles, five sacks, a forced fumble, a fumble recovery and four passes defensed.

Porter bounced back in 2004 with the second Pro Bowl selection of his career. In an October 31 win against the New England Patriots, he recorded four tackles, three sacks and two forced fumbles. He was selected the AFC Defensive Player of the Week for his performance. He recorded two sacks against the Washington Redskins on November 28, and had his lone interception of the season on December 26 on a pass from Baltimore Ravens quarterback Kyle Boller. Porter finished the year with 53 tackles, seven sacks and an interception.

On November 14 against the Browns, Porter and Browns running back William Green were both ejected prior to kickoff due to a pregame fight. Porter's backup, James Harrison (who would ultimately replace Porter in the starting lineup after Porter left Pittsburgh), would get his first NFL start in place of Porter.

Porter had one of his best years in 2005 as his team went on to beat the Seattle Seahawks in Super Bowl XL. He was named to the third Pro Bowl of his career and the second in two years. On the year, he tied a career-high with 10.5 sacks while adding 56 tackles, two interceptions and four forced fumbles. He recorded a sack in four of the team's first five games of the season. In a 41–0 win over the Cleveland Browns on December 24, he had five tackles, three sacks and a forced fumble.

In what would be his final year as a member of the Steelers, Porter recorded seven sacks on the year, six of them in three games against the Miami Dolphins, Oakland Raiders and Tampa Bay Buccaneers and another half sack against the Cleveland Browns. In the season opener against the Miami Dolphins, he intercepted a Daunte Culpepper pass in the fourth quarter and returned it for his first interception touchdown to seal a victory. He missed two games in October while nursing a hamstring injury. He finished the year with 55 tackles and seven sacks.

Miami Dolphins
With the Steelers in transition under new head coach Mike Tomlin, the team released Porter on March 1, 2007 in lieu of paying him a $1 million roster bonus. He received immediate interest from a handful of teams, including Pittsburgh's three division rivals—the Cincinnati Bengals, Cleveland Browns and Baltimore Ravens. The Dallas Cowboys, New York Giants and San Diego Chargers were also in the mix, but it came down to the Cincinnati Bengals and Miami Dolphins. After Dolphins head coach Cam Cameron and general manager Randy Mueller flew to Porter's home in owner Wayne Huizenga's jet, Porter was persuaded to sign with the Dolphins.

Porter was officially signed by the Dolphins on March 8, 2007. He received a five-year deal worth approximately $32 million. The deal includes a $12 million signing bonus and $8 million in guaranteed money. He was immediately named the starting strongside linebacker, playing opposite Jason Taylor—the 2006 NFL Defensive Player of the Year Award. Porter struggled during the 2007 season, recording only 5.5 sacks, his lowest total since 2003.

The 2008 season saw a rejuvenated Porter return to his old form, leading the AFC and finishing second in the NFL with a career-high 17.5 sacks; thus, he played an integral role in helping the Dolphins improve from the 1–15 Dolphins of 2007 into an 11–5 AFC East champion football team. For the season, he was named to his fourth Pro Bowl and was named Second-team All-Pro.

Porter started for the Dolphins at outside linebacker in 2009 and was named a team captain. In a poll of 296 NFL players, he tied Washington's Albert Haynesworth as the second dirtiest defensive player in the league. During Week 9, Porter took heat from the press after calling out the New England Patriots quarterback Tom Brady and leaving the game after recording zero tackles and avoiding the press.

The next week, Porter was suspended for one game by Dolphins coach Tony Sparano for undisclosed reasons. He was released on March 5, 2010.

Arizona Cardinals
On March 19, 2010, Porter signed a three-year, $24.5 million contract with the Arizona Cardinals, with $17.5 million in guaranteed money. In his first season with the Cardinals, he recorded 50 tackles and five sacks. In 2011, he only played in six games due to injury, recording 16 tackles and one sack.

On March 28, 2010, Porter was arrested on suspicion of drunken driving and assault on a California Highway Patrol officer. It was later announced that all charges were dropped.

Retirement
On July 19, 2012, Porter announced he would retire from the NFL. He had talked to Steelers owner Art Rooney II and general manager Kevin Colbert about signing a one-day contract so that he could retire as a Pittsburgh Steeler. On August 3, 2012, Porter was officially retired as a Pittsburgh Steeler during the evening festivities of the Steelers training camp at St. Vincent College in Latrobe, Pennsylvania.

On December 24, 2012, Porter was freed from jail after three days for writing a bad check. He paid $70,000 to cover the check to the Hard Rock Casino for "casino markers"  given to him in June and July 2012. In March 2013, news outlets reported that Porter's South Florida mansion was facing foreclosure. On July 31, 2013 Colorado State coach Jim McElwain announced that Porter would join the Colorado State coaching staff; he would also finish his degree.

NFL career statistics

Coaching career
Porter served as a defensive assistant under former Steelers defensive coordinator, Dick LeBeau, for the 2014 season. In February 2015, Porter was promoted to outside linebackers coach under new defensive coordinator, Keith Butler.

Near the end of the Wild Card Playoff game against the Cincinnati Bengals on January 9, 2016, Porter was on the field during an injury timeout, although assistant coaches are not permitted on the field during an injury. He appeared to be arguing with a number of Bengals players, receiving a push from Bengals cornerback Adam Jones, drawing a 15-yard penalty against Cincinnati. The penalty set up the Steelers for a 35-yard field goal with seconds left that was the eventual game-winning kick. Porter was issued a reported $10,000 fine by the NFL for his actions on the field. In 2016, the incident has been made into a new NFL rule, called the "Joey Porter Rule", which expressly prohibits assistant coaches from entering the field of play. On January 9, 2017, Porter was placed on administrative leave after being arrested the day prior. He was reinstated to the coaching staff on January 13, 2017 after a subsequent investigation by the District Attorney dropped more serious charges and left him with only summary offenses. Porter resumed his coaching duties in the Steelers' 18–16 victory over the Kansas City Chiefs in the divisional playoff game on January 15, 2017. Porter was fired by the Steelers in January 2019 after his fourth season as the team’s outside linebackers coach.

Porter was officially hired by the San Antonio Brahmas on September 13, 2022

Personal life
Porter and his wife Christy have two boys; Joey and Jacob, and two girls; Jasmine and Jayla. Joey Porter Jr. is currently a member of the Penn State Nittany Lions football team.

On January 8, 2017, Porter was arrested at The Flats On Southside, a bar in Pittsburgh's South Side neighborhood and initially charged with aggravated assault, simple assault, resisting arrest, public drunkenness, and disorderly conduct. He was placed on leave the next day, but was reinstated a few days later when four of the six charges were dropped.

In 2012, Porter was arrested in Las Vegas for passing a bad check to a casino. Also in 2012, again in Las Vegas, Porter was accused of punching Levi Jones outside a casino, resulting in a $141,176 fine from the NFL.

He was previously arrested for Driving under the influence (DUI) in 2010, but the charges were later dropped.

References

External links
 Arizona Cardinals bio
 
 
 

1977 births
Living people
African-American players of American football
American Conference Pro Bowl players
American football outside linebackers
Arizona Cardinals players
Colorado State Rams football players
Miami Dolphins players
Pittsburgh Steelers coaches
Pittsburgh Steelers players
Players of American football from Bakersfield, California
Players of American football from Kansas City, Missouri
21st-century African-American sportspeople
20th-century African-American sportspeople